AIES may stand for:
 The Arava Institute for Environmental Studies, an Israeli research institute
 The AAAI/ACM Conference on AI, Ethics, and Society, a computer science conference